In nonstandard analysis, the standard part function is a function from the limited (finite) hyperreal numbers to the real numbers.  Briefly, the standard part function "rounds off" a finite hyperreal to the nearest real.  It associates to every such hyperreal , the unique real  infinitely close to it, i.e.  is infinitesimal.  As such, it is a mathematical implementation of the historical concept of adequality introduced by Pierre de Fermat, as well as Leibniz's Transcendental law of homogeneity.

The standard part function was first defined by Abraham Robinson who used the notation  for the standard part of a hyperreal  (see Robinson 1974). This concept plays a key role in defining the concepts of the calculus, such as continuity, the derivative, and the integral, in nonstandard analysis.  The latter theory is a rigorous formalization of calculations with infinitesimals.  The standard part of x is sometimes referred to as its shadow.

Definition

Nonstandard analysis deals primarily with the pair , where the hyperreals  are an ordered field extension of the reals , and contain infinitesimals, in addition to the reals.  In the hyperreal line every real number has a collection of numbers (called a monad, or halo) of hyperreals infinitely close to it.  The standard part function associates to a finite hyperreal x, the unique standard real number x0 that is infinitely close to it.  The relationship is expressed symbolically by writing

The standard part of any infinitesimal is 0.  Thus if N is an infinite hypernatural, then 1/N is infinitesimal, and 

If a hyperreal  is represented by a Cauchy sequence  in the ultrapower construction, then 

More generally, each finite  defines a Dedekind cut on the subset  (via the total order on ) and the corresponding real number is the standard part of u.

Not internal
The standard part function "st" is not defined by an internal set. There are several ways of explaining this. Perhaps the simplest is that its domain L, which is the collection of limited (i.e. finite) hyperreals, is not an internal set. Namely, since L is bounded (by any infinite hypernatural, for instance), L would have to have a least upper bound if L were internal, but L doesn't have a least upper bound.

Applications
All the traditional notions of calculus can be expressed in terms of the standard part function, as follows.

Derivative
The standard part function is used to define the derivative of a function f.  If f is a real function, and h is infinitesimal, and if f′(x) exists, then

Alternatively, if , one takes an infinitesimal increment , and computes the corresponding .  One forms the ratio . The derivative is then defined as the standard part of the ratio:

Integral

Limit
Given a sequence , its limit is defined by  where  is an infinite index.  Here the limit is said to exist if the standard part is the same regardless of the infinite index chosen.

Continuity
See microcontinuity for more details.

See also
Adequality
Nonstandard calculus

Notes

References 
H. Jerome Keisler. Elementary Calculus: An Infinitesimal Approach. First edition 1976; 2nd edition 1986. (This book is now out of print. The publisher has reverted the copyright to the author, who has made available the 2nd edition in .pdf format available for downloading at http://www.math.wisc.edu/~keisler/calc.html.)
Goldblatt, Robert. Lectures on the hyperreals. An introduction to nonstandard analysis. Graduate Texts in Mathematics, 188. Springer-Verlag, New York, 1998.
Abraham Robinson. Non-standard analysis. Reprint of the second (1974) edition. With a foreword by Wilhelmus A. J. Luxemburg. Princeton Landmarks in Mathematics. Princeton University Press, Princeton, NJ, 1996. xx+293 pp. 

Calculus
Nonstandard analysis
Real closed field